Dora Hand (c. 1844 – October 4, 1878), aged c. 34, was an American dance hall singer and actress in Dodge City, Kansas, who was mistakenly shot to death from ambush by a young suitor who was acquitted of criminal charges in the case. Hand was also linked romantically with James H. "Dog" Kelley, the mayor of Dodge City from 1867 to 1871.

Television and film depiction
Claire Trevor played Hand in the 1943 film The Woman of the Town, which depicts a fictional romance with Bat Masterson.

Phyllis Coates played Hand in the 1964 episode "The Left Hand Is Damned" of the syndicated television anthology series Death Valley Days, hosted by Ronald Reagan.  In the story line, Hand nurses the ungrateful gunslinger Slim Kennedy (Peter Haskell) back to health after he is shot in self-defense by Dora's boss, Mayor James H. Kelley (Stephen Roberts) of Dodge City, Kansas. Having lost the use of his right hand, Kennedy vows to kill Kelley and tries to develop skills with his left hand. However, Kennedy mistakenly kills Dora instead. Following this, Kennedy commits "suicide by cop".

English singer-songwriter Frank Turner released a song displaying her story in 2019.

References

1844 births
1878 deaths
People from Dodge City, Kansas
Businesspeople from Kansas
Deaths by firearm in Kansas
19th-century American women singers
19th-century American singers
19th-century American businesspeople